No. 2 Wing AAC is a former Wing of the British Army's Army Air Corps which was based in the United Kingdom.

Structure

 5 Regiment in Northern Ireland
 655 Squadron at Shackleton Barracks (Ballykelly)
 665 Squadron at  RAF Aldergrove

See also

 No. 1 Wing AAC
 List of Army Air Corps aircraft units

References

Citations

Bibliography

Aviation units and formations of the British Army
Military units and formations established in 1958
Military units and formations disestablished in 1989
1958 establishments in the United Kingdom